Garnett is a city in and the county seat of Anderson County, Kansas, United States.  As of the 2020 census, the population of the city was 3,242.

History
Garnett was platted in 1857. Garnett is named for W. A. Garnett, a native of Louisville, Kentucky, and early promoter of the town of Garnett.

The city includes three places listed on the National Register of Historic Places: Anderson County Courthouse, Sennett and Bertha Kirk House, and Shelley-Tipton House.

The city is also home to the 1858 Garnett House Hotel.

Geography

Garnett is famous for its fossil finds from the late Carboniferous period. The lagerstätte is about 300 million years old and contains some of the earliest reptiles on earth.

Climate
The climate in this area is characterized by hot, humid summers and generally mild to cool winters.  According to the Köppen Climate Classification system, Garnett has a humid subtropical climate, abbreviated "Cfa" on climate maps.

Demographics

2010 census
As of the census of 2010, there were 3,415 people, 1,419 households, and 862 families living in the city. The racial makeup of the city was 96.7% White, 0.4% African American, 0.6% Native American, 0.5% Asian, 0.6% from other races, and 1.3% from two or more races. Hispanic or Latino of any race were 2.1% of the population.

There were 1,419 households, of which 30.0% had children under the age of 18 living with them, 45.5% were married couples living together, 10.4% had a female householder with no husband present, 4.9% had a male householder with no wife present, and 39.3% were non-families. 34.0% of all households were made up of individuals, and 19.4% had someone living alone who was 65 years of age or older. The average household size was 2.33 and the average family size was 2.98.

The median age in the city was 40.9 years. 25.1% of residents were under the age of 18; 7.7% were between the ages of 18 and 24; 21.7% were from 25 to 44; 23% were from 45 to 64; and 22.5% were 65 years of age or older. The gender makeup of the city was 47.9% male and 52.1% female.

2000 census
As of the census of 2000, there were 3,368 people, 1,439 households, and 886 families living in the city. The racial makeup of the city was 96.97% White, 0.39% African American, 1.04% Native American, 0.27% Asian, 0.06% Pacific Islander, 0.53% from other races, and 0.74% from two or more races. Hispanic or Latino of any race were 1.45% of the population.

There were 1,439 households, out of which 28.8% had children under the age of 18 living with them, 50.2% were married couples living together, 8.5% had a female householder with no husband present, and 38.4% were non-families. 34.7% of all households were made up of individuals, and 21.1% had someone living alone who was 65 years of age or older. The average household size was 2.25 and the average family size was 2.91.

In the city, the population was spread out, with 24.4% under the age of 18, 7.5% from 18 to 24, 23.3% from 25 to 44, 20.7% from 45 to 64, and 24.1% who were 65 years of age or older. The median age was 41 years. For every 100 females, there were 88.2 males. For every 100 females age 18 and over, there were 82.1 males.

The median income for a household in the city was $31,518, and the median income for a family was $38,095. Males had a median income of $31,175 versus $19,858 for females. The per capita income for the city was $16,265. About 9.2% of families and 13.0% of the population were below the poverty line, including 18.6% of those under age 18 and 9.9% of those age 65 or over.

Education
The community is served by Garnett USD 365 public school district, and operates Garnett Elementary School and Anderson County Junior-Senior High School in Garnett.

Prior to school unification, the Garnett High School mascot was Bulldogs. The Anderson County High School mascot is also Bulldogs.

Infrastructure

Transportation

Rail
The area has one railroad, six freight lines and six interstate carriers.

Roads
Garnett is at the crossroads of U.S. Route 59, U.S. Route 169 and K-31. Interstate 35 is located 19 miles north of here and Interstate 70 is approximately 50 miles away.

Air
The Garnett Industrial Airport is located along U.S. 169. The nearest international air service is at the Kansas City International Airport, 90 miles away.

Bike
There is a bike path at Prairie Spirit Trail State Park, reusing the former Santa Fe Railroad through Garnett.

Notable people

 Sam Brownback, former United States Ambassador-at-Large for International Religious Freedom, former Governor of Kansas and former member of Congress
 Arthur Capper, former Governor of Kansas and US Senator
 Edgar Masters, poet, lawyer and playwright
 P. Thomas Thornbrugh, currently a judge on the Oklahoma Civil Appeals Court, was born in Garnett

References

Further reading

External links

 City of Garnett
 Garnett - Directory of Public Officials
 Garnett city map, KDOT

Cities in Kansas
County seats in Kansas
Cities in Anderson County, Kansas